"Dark Road" is a song by Annie Lennox, released on 24 September 2007, as the first single from her fourth solo album Songs of Mass Destruction.

UK television network Channel 4 aired the world television premiere of the music video exclusively on 22 August 2007. It was also the first video to be premiered on Amazon.com, initially being available for 48 hours only.

The track was released as a CD single and also as a DVD single. It charted at No. 58 on the UK Singles Chart.

Track listing
"Dark Road" (Album Version) – 3:47
"Dark Road" (Acoustic Version) – 3:30

Charts

Personnel
 Artwork By – Allan Martin
 Photography – Mark Langthorn, Mike Owen
 Vocals, Written-By – Annie Lennox

References

2007 singles
Annie Lennox songs
Songs written by Annie Lennox
Sony BMG singles
British soft rock songs
2007 songs